Ribatejada is a municipality of the Community of Madrid, Spain.

Sights include the Church of San Pedro Apóstol, in Mudéjar style (15th century).

References

Municipalities in the Community of Madrid